Golf at the 2010 Asian Games was held in Dragon Lake Golf Club, Guangzhou, China from November 17 to 20, 2010. Four competitions were held in both, men and women's.

Medalists

Medal table

Participating nations
A total of 107 athletes from 20 nations competed in golf at the 2010 Asian Games:

References

External links
Golf Site of 2010 Asian Games 

 
2010 Asian Games events
Asian Games
2010